Ko Kyu-pil (born May 2, 1982) is a South Korean actor. He debuted in the 1993 South Korean children's film Kid Cop and has thus appeared in notable television series and films in a supporting role.

Filmography

Film

Television series

Web series

Variety Show

Awards and nominations

References

External links 
Ko Kyu-pil at HanCinema

1982 births
Living people
20th-century South Korean male actors
21st-century South Korean male actors
South Korean male film actors
South Korean male television actors
South Korean male web series actors